Elena Melnik (Russian: Елена Мельник; born September 8, 1986, in Sverdlovsk, Soviet Union) is a Russian fashion model.

Biography 
She began her career in 2005, when she debuted on the runway as an exclusive model for Calvin Klein.  She has also appeared on the runway for brands including Louis Vuitton, Balmain, Diane von Furstenberg, Marchesa, MaxMara, Rodarte, Trovata, among many others.

Melnik has been featured on the cover of Vogue Spain, Vogue Portugal, Harper's Bazaar UK, ZOO Magazine, L'Officiel Italia, Marie Claire Italia, Elle Brasil, Flair Magazine and has appeared in editorials in British, German, French, Spanish, and Italian Vogue.  

Melnik's most notable campaign works include two seasons as the face of Givenchy cosmetics, a Vera Wang fragrance contract, a Boucheron fragrance contract, and ads for D&G, Lacoste, Sportmax, Joseph, and Barbara Bui.

She is represented by Silent models in Paris.

References

External links

Photos of Elena Melnik at style.com
Online Portfolio

1986 births
Living people
People from Yekaterinburg
Russian female models